Omar Ali Omar (Arabic:عمر علي عمر) (born 16 June 1981) is an Emirati footballer. He currently plays as a defender.

External links

References

Emirati footballers
1981 births
Living people
Al Wahda FC players
Emirates Club players
Fujairah FC players
Al Dhafra FC players
Dibba Al-Hisn Sports Club players
UAE First Division League players
UAE Pro League players
Association football defenders
Footballers at the 2002 Asian Games
Asian Games competitors for the United Arab Emirates